Rebecca Ann Sedwick (October 19, 2000 – September 9, 2013) was a 12-year-old American student at Crystal Lake Middle School in Lakeland, Florida who died by suicide when she jumped off a concrete silo tower, just 1 month and 10 days before her thirteenth birthday. Investigation into her death led to a conclusion of in-person and cyberbullying contributing to the decision to take her own life. Sedwick's family later filed a lawsuit in relation to her death.

Background, history and suicide 
Rebecca Sedwick and her family were originally from Sebring, Florida. While battling with depression and anxiety, she began to engage in self-mutilation by cutting. At one point, Sedwick was hospitalized for three days as a result of her actions. After returning to school, an incident in a hallway with another student played a role in the decision to remove Sedwick from public school and begin the process of homeschooling. Her mother also deactivated her social media accounts and took away her mobile phone.

After returning to the public school system and transferring to another school to give her a fresh start, Rebecca was given her mobile phone privileges back and she opened accounts on services such as Kik, Ask.fm and Voxer. Snapshots later emerged of anonymous comments that were written to Sedwick on Ask.fm saying things like “Nobody cares about you”,  “you seriously deserve to die” and “drink bleach and die.” It was later determined that, as the bullying grew worse, Sedwick was beginning to have suicidal thoughts. These thoughts were discovered to have begun about a year prior to her death. The investigation also showed new conflicts with students at school and Sedwick was withdrawn from public school in February 2013.

A search of Rebecca's mobile phone and computer uncovered internet searches like, “What is overweight for a 13 year-old girl?” and “How much Advil do you have to overdose in order to die?” Pictures of Sedwick with razor blades lying on her arms were shown on her mobile phone and her mobile phone wallpaper showed pictures of her head resting on the edge of a railroad track. Before her death, she changed her name on one of her mobile phone apps to “That Dead Girl,” and messaged a 12-year-old friend in North Carolina saying, "I'm jumping, I can't take it anymore."

Following a media investigation, it was revealed that, a week prior to Rebecca's death, she received messages on her phone asking her why she was still alive and telling her to go kill herself.

On September 9, 2013, Sedwick was found dead after jumping off an abandoned cement plant. At the time of her death, Sedwick was a grade 7 student at Crystal Lake Middle School in Lakeland, Florida.

Investigation and arrest 
On September 17, 2013, two minors were charged with aggravated stalking, and accused of bullying Sedwick during an argument over a boy. The charges would later be dropped due to a lack of evidence.

Aftermath and reaction 
Sedwick's mother refuted claims that she was accountable for Rebecca's death and vowed to work with lawmakers in Florida to strengthen anti-bullying laws. However, some experts, like Debbie Johnston, national legislative liaison for Bully Police USA, say that the "laws are there" and that society needs to "have a culture that tells us this is what’s right to do”. The circumstances of Sedwick's death were compared to another Florida teenager that committed suicide after aggressive bullying seven years before. Others have said that, “The problem is not the kids reporting suicidal thoughts and bullying, the problem is usually the adults who do not listen and follow up.” Others  have said that parents need to have a greater idea of what their children are doing, both on and off-line, because teenagers cannot self-regulate.

Sedwick's mother established the Rebecca Sedwick Funeral Fund and Anti-Bullying Campaign, receiving donations to support anti-bullying awareness education and programs for children and teens with mental health problems. The campaign's goal was to raise $5,400 to pay for the costs of Rebecca's funeral, with any additional funds being donated to The Jaylens Challenge Foundation, a local non-profit organization dedicated to promoting awareness and prevention of bullying through education and community service.

See also
 Bullying
 List of suicides that have been attributed to bullying

References

External links
 Rebecca Ann Sedwick at Find a Grave

Bullying and suicide
Deaths by person in Florida
2013 in Florida
Youth suicides
Victims of cyberbullying
September 2013 events in the United States
Suicides by jumping in Florida
2013 suicides